Detention of the Dead is a 2012 American comedy horror film written and directed by Alex Craig Mann, based on the Rob Rinow stage play of the same name. Filming began in spring 2011. It had a small theatrical release in Los Angeles on June 28, 2013, and was released on DVD on July 23, 2013.

Plot
High school student Eddie (Jacob Zachar) reports to after-school detention at Lincoln High School. Upon arrival,  Eddie sees a few familiar faces: Janet (Christa B. Allen), a cheerleader whom he has a crush on; Brad (Jayson Blair), a jock and high-school football player who bullies Ed and plans to join the ROTC; Jimmy (Max Adler), another football player/jock who also bullies Eddie and is good friends with Brad; Ash (Justin Chon), a happy-go-lucky stoner; and Eddie's best friend Willow (Alexa Nikolas), a goth who shares with him a love for zombie movies. During detention, Ash attempts to sell drugs to Mark (Joseph Porter), a quiet student in detention. Ash quickly realizes Mark is unwell and alerts Mrs. Rumblethorp (Michele Messmer). However, Mark becomes aggressive, biting Mrs. Rumblethorp and forcing the group to evacuate the detention room despite Eddie's suggestion for the teacher to back away from him due to his current condition.

In the school corridors the group discover a wide-scale zombie outbreak with all the other students now undead. They decide to barricade themselves in the school library; believing no one would ever go there. Mrs. Rumblethorp eventually dies and reanimates, causing the group to restrain her as Ash decapitates her with a paper cutter. Brad is bitten in the chaos, but keeps it hidden from the group. Sometime later, the group decide to search the library for available information on zombies. While searching the book stacks, the librarian attacks and bites Jimmy, before Brad kills the zombie. Eddie and Willow argue that they must kill Jimmy before he becomes a zombie, but Brad remains confident that his friend can survive his bite. However, Jimmy accepts his fate and jumps out a window where he is eaten by a group of zombies.

As the group panic at their situation, Ash convinces the group to smoke weed to calm their nerves. While doing so, the group bond, learning more about each other, challenging their original high-school stereotypes, which they list openly: the nerd (Eddie), the social outcast and goth (Willow), the popular, self-involved cheerleader (Janet), the jock (Brad) and the stoner (Ash). Eddie reveals a gun he kept in his bag, which he was planning on using to commit suicide after not being accepted into Harvard University. The group are then attacked by the zombies and narrowly manage to remain safe within the library. Realizing the barricades will not hold, Brad, Willow and Ash decide to escape through the vents while Eddie and Janet remain in the library. While in the vents, the group discover zombified rats who eat Ash, before the vent breaks, leaving Willow and Brad stranded in the halls of the school. They arm themselves with Ash's severed legs and begin to fight through the hordes of zombies back to the library. Meanwhile, Janet convinces Eddie to take her virginity, but the pair are interrupted by Willow and Brad.

Inside the library, Willow is hurt when she realizes Eddie's intentions with Janet. The barricades of the door begin to weaken, before Brad eventually succumbs to his infection and attacks Janet, who manages to knock him out of a window nearby. Eddie formulates a plan to escape, building a makeshift cart out of materials in the library. The survivors fight through the school corridors and make it to the school gym. While climbing a ladder up to the roof, a zombie bites Janet on the leg. Realizing she is going to die, Janet pleads with Willow to shoot her. However, zombies begin to climb the ladder, and the remaining bullets are used fending them off. The zombified Brad attacks the group, and Janet sacrifices herself by pushing herself and Brad off the roof. Eddie and Willow sit defeated on the roof, until military units descend on the school. The zombies are killed, and Eddie and Willow leave the school. As the pair share their first kiss, a zombified Janet tackles Eddie to the ground to infect him, but the military open fire and eliminate her, saving Eddie's life hence enabling him and Willow to return home peacefully.

Cast
 Jacob Zachar as Eddie
 Alexa Nikolas as Willow
 Christa B. Allen as Janet
 Jayson Blair as Brad
 Justin Chon as Ash
 Max Adler as Jimmy
 Joseph Porter as Mark
 Joey Paul Gowdy as Zombified Student
 Michele Messmer as Mrs. Rumblethorp

References

External links
 
 

2012 films
2012 comedy horror films
2012 independent films
2010s English-language films
2010s high school films
2010s monster movies
2010s teen comedy films
2010s teen horror films
American films based on plays
American high school films
American independent films
American teen comedy films
American teen horror films
American zombie comedy films
Films shot in Michigan
2010s American films